Dhanushka Jayakody (born July 18, 1981, in Colombo, Sri Lanka) is a business consultant from Sri Lanka. He served as the Country Representative of MTI Consulting in Sri Lanka, Bangladesh and Pakistan. and a project manager of MTI operation in India. He was also a board of advisors for AIESEC in Sri Lanka and Pakistan. He was the CEO of Colombo Institute of Social Sciences (CISS) and currently involved with Symbiosis Business Partners based in Australia.

Early life and education
Jayakody was born and raised in Colombo, Sri Lanka. He studied at Royal College. He then went to Chartered Institute of Marketing and graduated in 2001. He holds an MBA from University of Wales. He is a fellow member of the Chartered Institute of Marketing of the United Kingdom and Institute of Certified Management Accountants of Australia.

Career 
Jayakody began his career as a business analyst at MTI Consulting in 2001. He has contributed to many companies in Sri Lanka as a consultant with MTI Consulting. He has won the “Best Performance Award” within its network in 2006 and 2008 and was involved in the expansion of MTI's operations to Bangladesh, India and Pakistan.

In 2005, Jayakody was promoted to Country representative of MTI Consulting in Bangladesh. He was also the project manager of MTI operation in Bengaluru area of India. In 2006, Jayakody became the Country manager of MTI operation in Pakistan and served until July 2009.  In August 2009, he became the head of Corporate Solutions of MTI Consulting in Sri Lanka and served until the end of 2010. He has handled a number of Strategic Planning, Re-Structuring and Marketing projects.

In 2011, he joined as a senior consultant of Symbiosis Business Partners and currently involved with its operation in Australia.

Industry involvement
In 2007, Jayakody was appointed to the local Board of Directors for AIESEC Karachi. Having served as a board advisor to the AIESEC movement in Pakistan, Jayakody has given thought leadership on several contemporary matters from a South Asian perspective and has been a speaker at various conferences. He has been also involved with the Institute of Personnel. He was a member of the Panel of Judges at the Great HR Debate of the IPM Sri Lanka in 2009, 2011, 2012 and 2014.

References

External links
Company website

Living people
People from Colombo
Alumni of Royal College, Colombo
People from Canberra
Alumni of the University of Wales
Sinhalese businesspeople
Sri Lankan business executives
1981 births